Bega Group is one of the largest Romanian holding companies, located in Timișoara, Timiș County. The holding is formed by 12 different companies. The company owns the largest industrial park in Bucharest, Faur, an industrial platform occupied by over 200 companies. The company also owns the largest Romanian outdoor amusement park, Arsenal Park Transilvania.

References 

Holding companies of Romania
Holding companies established in 1990
Romanian companies established in 1990
Companies based in Timișoara